Events from the year 1576 in art.

Events

Works

Lavinia Fontana - Christ with the Symbols of the Passion
Wen Jia – Landscape in the Spirit of the Verses of Du Fu

Births
June 16 - Giovanni Battista Viola, Italian painter of landscape canvases (died 1622)
August - David Vinckboons, Dutch painter of Flemish origin (died 1632)
September 1 - Scipione Borghese, Italian art collector (died 1633)
date unknown
Santino Solari, Swiss architect and sculptor (died 1646)
Roelant Savery, Flanders-born Dutch baroque painter of the Golden Age (died 1633)
Gregorio Fernández, Spanish sculptor Castilian school of sculpture (died 1636)
Francisco Herrera the Elder, Spanish painter and founder of the Seville school for the arts (died 1656)
Giovanni Battista Billoni, Italian painter born in Padua (died 1636)
Leonello Spada, Italian Caravaggisti specializing in decorative quadratura painting (died 1622)
probable
Cornelis Boel, Flemish draughtsman and engraver (died 1621)
Pietro Paolo Bonzi, Italian painter, best known for his landscapes and still-lifes (died 1636)
Cornelis Claesz van Wieringen, Dutch Golden Age painter (died 1633)

Deaths
February 22 - Bernardino Gatti, Italian painter (born c.1495)
May 26 - Vincenzo Danti, Italian sculptor (born 1530)
August 27 – Titian, leader of the 16th-century Venetian school of the Italian Renaissance (born 1485)
November 27 - Santi Buglioni, Italian sculptor (born 1494)
date unknown
Pieter Claeissens the Elder, Flemish painter (born 1500)
Aqa Mirak, Persian illustrator and painter (born unknown)
Lorenzo Sabbatini, Italian Mannerist painter (born c.1530)
Levina Teerlinc, Flemish miniaturist who served as a painter to the English court (born 1510/1520)
Lu Zhi, Chinese landscape painter, calligrapher, and poet during the Ming Dynasty (born c.1496)

 
Years of the 16th century in art